Lawrence Edgar Miles (27 March 1896 – 17 November 1967) was a cricketer who played first-class cricket for Border from 1913 to 1934.

While aged 17 and a student at Selborne College in East London, Miles made his first-class debut for Border, alongside another Selbornian, Roelof Oosthuizen, against the touring MCC in November 1913. He next played for Border with the resumption of first-class cricket after World War I, and was a regular member of the team during the 1920s, sometimes as captain. He captained a Cape Province team against the MCC in 1930-31.

He was a middle-order batsman whose highest score was 98 against Natal in the Currie Cup in 1923–24.

Miles married Molly McCann in August 1929. He died in East London in 1967.

References

External links

1896 births
1967 deaths
South African cricketers
Border cricketers
Alumni of Selborne College